The 1972 Piccadilly World Match Play Championship was the ninth World Match Play Championship. It was played from Thursday 12 to Saturday 14 October on the West Course at Wentworth. Eight players competed in a straight knock-out competition, with each match contested over 36 holes. The champion received £8,500 out of a total prize fund of £25,000. In the final, Tom Weiskopf beat Lee Trevino 4 & 3 to win the championship.

Grier Jones was a surprise invitee for the event. Relatively unknown in Europe, he had won two events on the 1972 PGA Tour and runner-up in two others. He met Tony Jacklin in the first round and lost 7 & 6.

Peter Oosterhuis beat defending champion Gary Player in the first round. Oosterhuis won four of the first five holes and went 5 up after an eagle at the 12th. Player won three of the remaining holes to go to lunch only two holes down and had levelled the match by the 13th hole of the afternoon round. Oosterhuis holed a 30-foot putt at the 16th and eventually won by one hole.

Course
Source:

Scores
Source:

Prize money
The winner received £8,500, the runner-up £4,500, the losing semi-finalists £3,000 and the first round losers £1,500, making a total prize fund of £25,000.

References

Volvo World Match Play Championship
Golf tournaments in England
Piccadilly World Match Play Championship
Piccadilly World Match Play Championship
Piccadilly World Match Play Championship